The Columbia Air Center was an airfield in Croom, Maryland from 1941 to 1958.  It was started by African American pilots who were not permitted to use other airports, but was also open to whites.  It had an all black staff, and a number of the trainers had served in World War II as Tuskegee Airmen.

John R. Pinkett founded the airport in Croom, Maryland, in Prince George's County on leased land near the Patuxent River.  It housed up to five runways, three hangars, ten planes, and an all-black chapter of the Civil Air Patrol. The airport was operated from 1941-1954 by John William Greene Jr, and also by Tuskegee Airmen, Herbert Jones Jr., who would later form International Air Association, the first African-American owned airline.

In 1959, the property was purchased by the Maryland-National Capital Park and Planning Commission and became the first part of the Patuxent River Watershed Park.

References

External links 

Cloud Club II
Columbia Air Center from The Maryland-National Capital Park and Planning Commission, who now runs the park

African-American history of Prince George's County, Maryland
Buildings and structures in Prince George's County, Maryland
Aviation in Maryland
1941 establishments in Maryland